Michael Levin (born August 8, 1958) is an American, New York Times best-selling author. On January 20, 2012, Michael appeared as a guest entrepreneur on the ABC Television show Shark Tank.  He started and sold the book writing firm BusinessGhost, Inc., and in 2018 started a new book ghostwriting firm, Michael Levin Writing Company.

Speaking and publications

As a co-writer, Michael has done books with:

·  Baseball Hall of Famer Dave Winfield

·  Football broadcasting legend Pat Summerall

·  Hollywood publicist Howard Bragman

·  Former Schwab CEO David Pottruck

·  E-Myth creator Michael Gerber

·  Three-time Super Bowl winner Chad Hennings of the Dallas Cowboys

·  Rock and Roll Fantasy Camp founder David Fishof

·  Fox Sports Broadcaster Chris Myers

·  NBA star Doug Christie

·  FBI undercover agent Joaquin Garcia

·  Marketing legend Jay Abraham

·  NFL star running back Maurice Jones-Drew

·  NFL star running back Benjamin Watson.

Levin's books have received positive reviews in The New York Times, the Los Angeles Times, the New Yorker, People Magazine, the Washington Post, The San Francisco Chronicle, Library Journal, the Boston Globe, Chicago Tribune, and other leading publications.  He has taught writing at UCLA and New York University.  In recent years, he has been a regular contributor to Forbes.com, Jerusalem Post, the New York Daily News, Huffington Post, and FoxNews.com, where some of his pieces have attracted more than one million readers.

Personal life

Levin is married and the father of four.  He has run nine Boston Marathons and six New York City Marathons; in NYC he runs as a guide for runners with disabilities on behalf of Achilles International.  He has performed with the Tanglewood Festival Chorus of the Boston Symphony Orchestra in the 1980s and again in the late 2010s.

Books

References

External links
 

Living people
American businesspeople
1958 births
Place of birth missing (living people)